Dolnje Orle (in older sources also Dolenje Orlje) is a small settlement in the Municipality of Sevnica in central Slovenia. It lies in the hills south of Sevnica in the historical region of Lower Carniola. The municipality is now included in the Lower Sava Statistical Region.

References

External links
Dolnje Orle at Geopedia

Populated places in the Municipality of Sevnica